Prabhas Kumar Singh is an Indian politician. He was Member of Parliament for Bargarh constituency in Odisha, which he represented in the 16th Lok Sabha from 2014 to 2019. He is a member of the Biju Janata Dal. He was elected in 2014 by a margin of 11,178 votes, or 1.01% of the votes cast.

See also
 Indian general election, 2014 (Odisha)

References

Living people
Lok Sabha members from Odisha
India MPs 2014–2019
1967 births
People from Bargarh district
Sambalpur University alumni
Biju Janata Dal politicians